The 1992 Stockholm Open was a men's tennis tournament played on indoor carpet courts. It was the 24th edition of the Stockholm Open and was part of the ATP Super 9 of the 1992 ATP Tour. It took place at the Stockholm Globe Arena in Stockholm, Sweden, from 26 October through 2 November 1992. Fourth-seeded Goran Ivanišević won the singles title.

Finals

Singles

 Goran Ivanišević defeated  Guy Forget, 7–6(7–2), 4–6, 7–6(7–5), 6–2
It was Goran Ivanišević's 4th title of the year, and his 6th overall. It was his 1st Masters title.

Doubles

 Todd Woodbridge /  Mark Woodforde defeated  Steve DeVries /  David Macpherson, 6–3, 6–4

References

External links
 
 ATP tournament profile
 ITF tournament edition details

 
Stockholm Open
Stockholm Open